Ghazi Challouf (born 15 June 1990) is a Tunisian football midfielder.

References

1990 births
Living people
Tunisian footballers
CS Sfaxien players
EGS Gafsa players
JS Kairouan players
Stade Tunisien players
El Raja SC players
Association football midfielders
Tunisian Ligue Professionnelle 1 players
Tunisian expatriate footballers
Expatriate footballers in Egypt
Tunisian expatriate sportspeople in Egypt